AFS Intercultural Programs (or AFS, originally the American Field Service) is an international youth exchange organization. It consists of over 50 independent, not-for-profit organizations, each with its own network of volunteers, professionally staffed offices, volunteer board of directors and website. , 12,578 students traveled abroad on an AFS cultural exchange program, between 99 countries. The U.S.-based partner, AFS-USA, sends more than 1,100 U.S. students abroad and places international students with more than 2,300 U.S. families each year. More than 424,000 people have gone abroad with AFS and over 100,000 former AFS students live in the U.S.

History of the AFS Intercultural Programs

World War I 
 

When war broke out in 1914, the American Colony of Paris organized an "ambulance"—the French term for a temporary military hospital—just as it had done in the Franco-Prussian War of 1870 when the "American Ambulance" had been under tents set up near the Paris home of its founder, the celebrated Paris-American dentist, Dr. Thomas W. Evans. The "American Ambulance" of 1914 took over the premises of the unfinished Lycée Pasteur in the suburb of Neuilly-sur-Seine—and was run by the nearby American Hospital of Paris.

The volunteer drivers of 1914 found themselves behind the wheels of motorized, not horse-driven, vehicles: Model-Ts, purchased from the nearby Ford plant in Levallois-Perret.

In the fall of 1914, when the war front moved away from Paris, the American Ambulance set up an outpost in Juilly and sent out detached units of volunteer drivers to serve informally with the British and Belgian armies in the north. In early 1915, one of those drivers, A. Piatt Andrew, was appointed “Inspector of Ambulances” by Robert Bacon, head of the American Ambulance and one of Andrew's colleagues from the Taft Administration.

The newly appointed inspector toured the ambulance sections of Northern France and learned that the American volunteers were bored with so-called "jitney work," transporting wounded soldiers from railheads to hospitals far back from the front lines.  French army policy prohibited foreign nationals from traveling into battle zones.

In March 1915, Andrew met with Captain Aimé Doumenc, head of the French Army Automobile Service and pleaded his case for the American volunteers.  They desired above all, he said,  "to pick up the wounded from the front lines…, to look danger squarely in the face; in a word, to mingle with the soldiers of France and to share their fate!" Doumenc agreed to give Andrew a trial.  The success of Section Z was immediate and overwhelming, and by April 15, 1915, the French created American Ambulance Field Service operating under French Army command.

This marked the formal beginning of American Ambulance Field Service, three units of which made their mark during battles in northern France, the Champagne, Verdun and the Vosges.

By the summer of 1916, the Field Service severed its ties with the American Ambulance and moved its operations from cramped quarters in Neuilly to Paris, onto the spacious grounds of the Delessert château at 21 rue Raynouard in the Passy area of Paris. There, it grew rapidly over the next year, continuing to provide "sanitary sections" to the French Army, while also serving as a recruitment source of combat pilots for the newly formed Escadrille Lafayette, one of whose prime movers, Dr. Edmund L. Gros, was the Field Service's in-house physician.

When the United States entered the war in April 1917, the French Army successfully appealed to the Field Service for drivers for its military transport sections —and so, no longer limited to medical transport, the organization renamed itself the “American Field Service”, thus establishing today's well-known acronym, “AFS”.

Before the AFS was absorbed into the much larger, federalized U.S. Army Ambulance Service, it had numbered more than 2500 volunteers, including some 800 drivers of French military transport trucks. It had actively recruited its drivers from the campuses of American colleges and universities, promoting morale by creating units with volunteers from the same schools. All financed their own uniforms and transportation to France where they worked under the same conditions as French ambulance drivers—with the same pay—and often found themselves serving under extremely dangerous missions on the Front. By the end of the war, some 127 men who had served with the AFS were killed and a notable number of individuals and units earned the Croix de Guerre and the Médaille de Guerre for their heroic actions as drivers.

Other volunteer ambulance corps served the French Army as “foreign sanitary sections”  during World War I. The first was Henry Harjes’ “Formation” units under the American Red Cross, followed by Richard Norton's American Volunteer Motor-Ambulance Corps, organized in London under the St. John's Ambulance (the British Red Cross). Later, both would merge —under the American Red Cross—as the “Norton-Harjes”. In the summer and fall of 1917, when all the volunteer ambulance services were invited to join the new U.S. Army Ambulance Service,  Norton's units simply disbanded, while Harjes’, under the American Red Cross, moved into Italy where they would subsequently serve under the USAAS.

Once the Americans entered the war, many drivers joined combat units, both French and American, serving as officers in a variety of assignments, notably in air force and artillery units.  At the same time, a large percentage of volunteers signed up for the military, thenceforth members of USAAS units, but remaining identified with their AFS past—a past kept alive through the work of HQ, still at 21 rue Raynouard, where a Bulletin was published and where visiting ambulance drivers could find temporary lodgings and meals.

World War I publications 
The young AFS drivers came from "prominent families in the States," and had attended, or were still attending, one of almost a hundred prominent colleges or universities around the country.  Also represented were a smaller group from America's professional class: doctors, lawyers, architects, painters, brokers, businessmen, poets and writers.  This literate group produced many letters, diaries, journals, and even poetry.  The AFS collected many of these writings into Friends of France, published in 1916.  The Service used this volume to recruit more volunteers to the "gloriously exciting and grandly humanitarian" work of an ambulancier on the Western Front.

Also published in 1916, Ambulance Number 10, by Leslie Buswell, was composed of the author's letters back to the States.  Buswell went on to assist Henry Sleeper in the AFS's recruiting and fundraising offices in Boston.

Other literary "ambulanciers" brought their letters and journals and memoirs to American publishers in the coming years.  William Yorke Stevenson produced To The Front in a Flivver in 1917, stayed on in France after militarization, and composed From "Poilu" to "Yank" in 1918.  Robert Imbrie published Behind the Wheel of a War Ambulance in 1918, as did Julien Bryan with Ambulance 464: Encore des Blesses

The AFS recruits who joined the Service in late spring 1917, after Congress's declaration of war, were greeted by Piatt Andrew with a request: Would they forego ambulance driving for trucking supplies to the front?  Eight hundred AFS recruits joined the camion service, including John Kautz, who published Trucking to the Trenches in 1918.

After the war the Field Service produced three hefty volumes of writings from numerous AFS alumni, including excerpts from the previously published books above.

Between the wars 
Following the Great War, the AFS became sponsors for the French Fellowships—graduate student scholarships for study in France and in the US—which were ultimately administered by the Institute of International Education and were precedents for the Fulbright Foundation exchanges.  AFS also created an association for its veterans, publishing a bulletin, organizing reunions and contributing a wing to house its memorabilia at the Museum of Franco-American Cooperation in Blérancourt, France.

World War II 
When World War II broke out, AFS reorganized its ambulance service, sending units first to France and then to the British Armies in North Africa, Italy, India-Burma and with the Free French for the final drive from southern France to Germany.

Postwar 
In September 1946, Stephen Galatti,
president of AFS, established the American Field Service International Scholarships.  During the 1947–48 school year, the first students came from ten countries including Czechoslovakia, Estonia, France, Great Britain, Greece, Hungary, the Netherlands, New Zealand, Norway and Syria. Students participating had to be nominated by their teachers.

Modern day 

, there are over 55 AFS organizations worldwide serving over 80 different countries, providing exchange opportunities for over 13,000 students and teachers annually.

AFS is one of the largest volunteer-based organizations of its kind in the world with more than 440,000 volunteers worldwide and more than 5,000 in the U.S. Tens of thousands of volunteers and a small staff make the AFS program happen worldwide. AFS volunteers are both young and old, busy professionals and retirees, and students and teachers. AFS provides development and training opportunities for volunteers.

AFS volunteers help in many areas including facilitating the AFS mission in the local community and schools by finding and interviewing students and families. Further involvement includes serving as a contact person for an AFS student, organizing fund raising events, and arranging activities for AFS students. As a volunteer-driven organization, AFS depends on donations of time to implement and monitor the delivery of programs.

Notable exception in the AFS network is its presence in China. Here AFS offers an outbound long-term student exchange program since 1997 and an inbound program since 2001. These programs however, are run and administrated by the China Education Association for International Exchange (CEAIE), an organization focusing on teacher exchanges that was founded by the Chinese Foreign Ministry and the Ministry of Education.

Statement of purpose 
AFS is an international, voluntary, non-governmental, non-profit organization that provides intercultural learning opportunities to help people develop the knowledge, skills and understanding needed to create a more just and peaceful world.

Notable AFS Ambulance Corps volunteers

Notable AFS exchange students

AFS-USA, Inc. 
AFS-USA, Inc. (a.k.a., AFS-USA) is the AFS partner organisation in the United States and is a registered 501(c)(3). Approximately 1,100 participants go abroad with AFS-USA annually. Over 2,300 international AFS students from AFS-USA partner countries are hosted in the U.S. annually. AFS-USA is supported by a volunteer base of over 5,000. Students aged 15 – 18 may partake in AFS-USA programs, while Gap Programs are available for individuals over 18 years of age on a gap year.

AFS-USA Public Diplomacy Initiatives 
Public Diplomacy Initiatives at AFS-USA offer support for international students to study in the United States and for U.S. students to study abroad via full funded scholarships by grant-making foundations or by the Educational and Cultural Affairs Bureau of the U.S. Department of State.

Congress Bundestag 
The Congress Bundestag Youth Exchange Program (CBYX) was launched in 1983 by the U.S. Congress and the German Parliament. AFS currently provides 50 merit-based, full scholarships for U.S. students and 60 scholarships for German participants.
In Germany it is called the "Parlamentarisches Patenschafts Programm" (PPP) and over the years the German authorities have made many efforts to present this as their "own program". Not only AFS Germany but all competitors are more or less behind-the-scene service providers so people may not recognized who is doing this program in Germany.

National Security Language Initiative for Youth (NSLI-Y) 
The National Security Language Initiative for Youth (NSLI-Y) program is part of a broader government-wide presidential initiative that prepares American citizens to be leaders in a global world. NSLI-Y encourages a lifetime of language study and cultural understanding by providing more than 600 fully funded scholarships to American high school students.

In 2018, NSLI-Y offers academic scholarships to learn Arabic, Mandarin Chinese, Hindi, Indonesian, Korean, Persian (Tajiki), Russian, and Turkish through summer and year-long programs in China, Morocco, Oman, Jordan, India, Korea, Russia, Tajikistan, Turkey, Taiwan, Indonesia, and other countries around the world.

Future Leaders Exchange (FLEX) 
The Future Leaders Exchange (FLEX) program originated in the FREEDOM Support Act, which was sponsored by U.S. Senator Bill Bradley and was passed by Congress in 1992. FLEX provides full merit-based scholarships to students from the countries of the former Soviet Union.

Kennedy-Lugar Youth Exchange and Study (YES) 
Kennedy-Lugar Youth Exchange and Study (YES) was initiated by The Department of State in the aftermath of Sept. 11. It aims to build bridges of understanding between Americans and people in countries with significant Muslim populations.

AFS-USA Scholarships 
AFS-USA awards more than $3 million in financial aid and scholarships to students each year. More than 40% of AFS-USA participants receive some form of financial assistance each year either need-based, merit-based or both. A partial list of scholarships and financial aid:
 Global Leaders is the primary AFS scholarship program, offering partial need and merit-based scholarships to qualified applicants.
 Faces of America is AFS-USA's signature diversity program and makes it possible for high school students from underserved communities to receive scholarship awards to study abroad in more than 23 countries around the world.
 AFS Family Scholarships are awards are given to applicants who are former host family members, returnees, children of returnees, and of descendants of AFS Ambulance Drivers.
 The Yoshi Hattori Memorial Scholarship is a merit-based scholarship is designed to promote intercultural understanding and peace, and was created in memory of Yoshi Hattori, an AFS Exchange Student to the U.S. from Japan.
 The Toshiyuki Tanaka American Embassy Scholarship is a need-based and merit-based scholarship awarded through the Pacific Affairs Section (PAS) of the U.S. Embassy in Tokyo and the generosity of Mr. Toshiyuki Tanaka.

References 

"Friends of France: the Field Service of the American Ambulance," described by its members.  Boston: Houghton Mifflin Company, 1916.
"History of the American Field Service in France," as told by its members, vols. 1–3, Boston: Houghton Mifflin, 1920.
Hansen, Arlen. "Gentlemen Volunteers." NY: Arcade Publishing, 1996, 2011.
Bryan, Julien H.  "Ambulance 464: Encore des Blesses."  NY: Macmillan Co., 1918.
Leslie Buswell. "Ambulance No. 10: Personal Letters from the Front." NY: Houghton Mifflin Co., 1916.
Imbrie, Robert Whitney.  "Behind the Wheel of a War Ambulance."  NY: Robert McBride and Co., 1918.
Kautz, John Iden. Trucking to the Trenches: Letters from France, June-November, 1917. Boston: Houghton Mifflin Co., 1918.
Stevenson, William Yorke.  To the Front in a Flivver.  Boston: Houghton Mifflin Company, 1917.
Stevenson, William Yorke.  From "Poilu" to "Yank".  Boston: Houghton Mifflin Company, 1918.

External links 
 
 Video interview of AFS students in INDIA, Ludovica Fois & Sophia Mersmann
 Our Story
 AFS in WWI – Digital Collection
 AFS in the Hospitality Club
 National Security Language Initiative for Youth (NSLI-Y) program site
 AFS Yogyakarta Indonesia | Bina Antarbudaya Chapter Yogyakarta

Non-profit organizations based in New York (state)
Organizations based in Brittany
Organizations established in 1915
Student exchange
1915 establishments in France